John Bulkeley was a British seaman, best known for leading survivors of the wreck of HMS Wager to safety. Bulkeley was the ship's gunner, not one of her commissioned officers. David Cheap, the ship's acting captain, had lost the confidence of his former crew, many of whom were convinced that when the ship was sunk, and their pay ended, they were no longer bound by the Royal Navy's discipline or chain of command.

140 of the ship's complement of 160, survived the wreck, but with very few salvaged supplies, in a very isolated region of southern Chile. By the time the ship's longboat, its largest boat, had been lengthened, over forty additional men had died of starvation, disease, or internal strife. Captain Cheap had shot one man himself.

When Bulkeley and most of the remaining survivors set out for Argentina, in the longboat, and two other surviving boats, they only had two weeks of food.

The longboat did make it to Argentina, but with just thirty survivors.  Bulkeley was able to arrange for passage of the survivors back to Europe, and when they arrived in Britain he and the ship's carpenter, John Cummins, published an account of their voyage that sold widely.

Unexpectedly, Captain Cheap, and three of his officers, including a young John Byron, also survived, and returned home after Bulkeley, after their Spanish captors exchanged them for Spanish captives.  George Anson, the commodore of the expedition of which Wager had been a part, would later pass legislation that clarified that ship's officers did retain authority over their crew, even if their ships were lost.

Publication
Bulkeley, with John Cummins, wrote an account of this experiences:

A voyage to the South-Seas, in the years 1740-1 (1743)

References

Cheap, David
British mutineers